X-48 may refer to:

 Boeing X-48, an experimental unmanned aerial vehicle
 Intel X48, a chipset for Intel Core 2 processors
 x48, hexadecimal value for the ASCII character 'H' (Numeric character reference)